Lilienthal Gliding Medal – the highest soaring award in the world, established by Fédération Aéronautique Internationale (FAI) in 1938 in honour of Otto Lilienthal, a German pioneer of human aviation.  It aims "to reward a particularly remarkable performance in gliding, or eminent services to the sport of gliding over a long period of time".  The award is made at the annual Fédération Aéronautique Internationale (FAI) General Conference.  The actual Lilienthal Medal was designed by Austrian artist Josef Humplik.

The first winner of the Lilienthal Gliding Medal in the world was Tadeusz Góra for his record-breaking  flight on 18 May 1938, glider PWS-101 from Bezmiechowa to Soleczniki (near Vilnius).

The Medal is awarded by the Fédération Aéronautique Internationale via vote of the delegates to the International Gliding Commission at the annual Plenary in March.  In 2012, it was decided to end the practice of awarding the Medal for accomplishments of the previous calendar year, and to associate the Medal with the year in which the recipient is determined.  Consequently, the year 2013 was not awarded, therefore does not appear in the table below.

Recipients
Recipients of the International Gliding Commission award, from 1938 to present, include:

See also

List of aviation awards

References

Aviation awards
Gliding
Awards established in 1938
 
Otto Lilienthal
1938 establishments in Switzerland